In enzymology, a flavone apiosyltransferase is an enzyme that catalyzes the chemical reaction

UDP-apiose + 5,7,4'-trihydroxyflavone 7-O-beta-D-glucoside  UDP + 5,7,4'-trihydroxyflavone 7-O-[beta-D-apiosyl-(1->2)-beta-D-glucoside]

Thus, the two substrates of this enzyme are UDP-apiose and 5,7,4'-trihydroxyflavone 7-O-beta-D-glucoside, whereas its 3 products are UDP, 5,7,4'-trihydroxyflavone (apigenin), and [[7-O-[beta-D-apiosyl-(1->2)-beta-D-glucoside]]].

This enzyme belongs to the family of glycosyltransferases, specifically the pentosyltransferases.  The systematic name of this enzyme class is UDP-apiose:5,4'-dihydroxyflavone 7-O-beta-D-glucoside 2''-O-beta-D-apiofuranosyltransferase. Other names in common use include uridine diphosphoapiose-flavone apiosyltransferase, and UDP-apiose:7-O-(beta-D-glucosyl)-flavone apiosyltransferase.  This enzyme participates in flavonoid biosynthesis.

References 

 

EC 2.4.2
Enzymes of unknown structure
Flavones metabolism